Mordvins (also Mordvinians, Mordovians; ; no equivalents in Moksha and Erzya) is an official term used in the Russian Federation to refer both to Erzyas and Mokshas since 1928.

Origin of the term 

According to recent Oxford studies:

Erzya-Moksha Autonomy 

The Erzya-Moksha Autonomy
 was approved in 1928 as Mordvin Okrug according to personal position of Josef Stalin, who attended the meeting. Deputy president of Supreme Court of Mordovia Vasily Martyshkin quotes Stalin and Timofey Vasilyev. Since Mokshas and Erzyas lived sparcely in many governorates Stalin believed it was impossible to establish many autonomous districts. And that was Mikifor Surdin, ethnic Moksha who proposed to establish not Erzya-Moksha autonomy, but a Mordvin okrug. Stalin liked his variant. That is what he has been being cursed till now in spite of the fact he was executed during the Great Purge. That was the time when the autonomy name changed to Mordvin. Only the "ethnonym" Mordvin was allowed in documents for Erzya and Moksha since then.

Timeline of restoring Erzya and Moksha ethnonyms

Altä velä Letter 

Mokshas from Altä velä wrote a collective open letter to Literaturnaya Gazeta in 1991.

Erzya and Moksha Peoples' Congress 

On the First Erzya and Moksha Peoples' Congress in 1989 the first point of the Congress Declaration was renaming Mordovia to Moksha and Erzya Autonomous Republic and banning the term Mordva.

Aftermath 
The Erzya and Moksha intelligentsia representatives, namely Professor Dmitry Tsygankin, admit they never believed in the Unified Mordvin people project.

Genetic studies 

According to recent DNA studies Mokshas and Erzyas do not share common ancestry.

Mordva Autochthonal Theory 

Mokshas are identified with Dyakovo culture since the 1970s; and also with the so-called Gorodetsk culture, which is presently considered a Soviet pseudoscience concocted by Prof.  and based on Soviet autochtonal theory (that is, the theory that all Volga Uralic ethnicities are autochthonal to the region and never migrated). Erzyas have a nomadic ancestry and are associated with Oka-Ryazan culture.

Languages

General information 
The Mordvinic languages, a subgroup of the Uralic family, are Erzya and Moksha, with about 500,000 native speakers each. Both are official languages of Mordovia alongside Russian. The medieval Meshcherian language may have been Mordvinic, or close to Mordvinic.
Erzya is spoken in the northern and eastern and north-western parts of Mordovia, as well as in the adjacent oblasts of Nizhny Novgorod, Penza, Samara, Saratov, Orenburg, and Ulyanovsk, and in the republics of Chuvashia, Tatarstan, and Bashkortostan. Moksha is the majority language in the western part of Mordovia.
Due to differences in phonology, lexicon, and grammar, Erzya and Moksha are not mutually intelligible, to the extent that Russian language is often used for intergroup communications.
The two Mordvinic languages also have separate literary forms. The Erzya literary language was created in 1922 and the Mokshan in 1923.
Both are currently written using the standard Russian alphabet.

Reconstruction of Mordvin language 
The Moksha and Erzya languages are closely related, therefore they are thought to share common ancestry. As to the degree of the languages proximity Arnaud Fournet presumes that if Moksha and Erzya had been a single language, they started to diverge 1500 years ago- the same time as French and Italian divided. Serebrenikov proves that Moksha preservs more archaic forms than those existing in Erzya.

Classification 
Until ca. 2010s most Finnic linguists considered Mordvinic and Mari languages as a single subdivision of so-called Volga-Finnic branch of the Uralic family.
Currently this approach is rejected by most scholars, and Mordvinic and Mari are considered distinct from each other: Mordvinic languages are believed to have a common ancestor with Balto-Finnic languages (Estonian and Finnish), while the Mari languages are closer to the Permic languages.

Names

While Robert G. Latham had identified Mordva as a self-designation, identifying it as a variant of the name Mari, Aleksey Shakhmatov in the early 20th century noted that Mordva was not used as a self-designation by the two Mordvinic tribes of the Erzya and Moksha. Nikolai Mokshin again states that the term has been used by the people as an internal self-defining term  to constitute their common origin. The linguist Gábor Zaicz underlines that the Mordvins do not use the name 'Mordvins' as a self-designation. Feoktistov wrote "So-called Tengushev Mordvins are Erzyans who speak the Erzyan dialect with Mokshan substratum and in fact they are an ethnic group of Erzyans usually referred to as Shokshas. It was the Erzyans who historically were referred to as Mordvins, and Mokshas usually were mentioned separately as "Mokshas". There is no evidence Mokshas and Erzyas were an ethnic unity in prehistory". Isabelle T. Keindler writes:Gradually major differences developed in customs, language and even physical appearance (until their conversion to Christianity the Erzia and Moksha did not intermarry and even today intermarriage is rare.) The two subdivisions of Mordvinians share no folk heroes in common – their old folksongs sing only of local heroes. Neither language has a common term to designate either themselves or their language. When a speaker wishes to refer to Mordvinians as a whole, he must use the term "Erzia and Moksha"

Early references
The ethnonym Mordva is possibly attested in Jordanes' Getica in the form of Mordens who, he claims, were among the subjects of the Gothic king Ermanaric. A land called Mordia at a distance of ten days journey from the Petchenegs is mentioned in Constantine VII's De administrando imperio.
In medieval European sources, the names Merdas, Merdinis, Merdium, Mordani, Mordua, Morduinos have appeared. In the Russian Primary Chronicle, the ethnonyms Mordva and mordvichi first appear in the 11th century. After the Mongol invasion of Rus', the name Mordvin rarely gets mentioned in Russian annals, and is only quoted after the Primary Chronicle up until the 15th–17th centuries.

Etymologies
The name Mordva is thought to originate from an Iranian (Scythian) word, mard, meaning "man". The Mordvin word mirde denoting a husband or spouse is traced to the same origin .

The first written mention of Erzya is considered to be in a letter dated to 968 AD, by Joseph, the Khazar khagan, in the form of arisa, and sometimes thought to appear in the works of Strabo and Ptolemy as Aorsy and Arsiity, respectively. Estakhri, from the 10th century, has recorded among the three groups of the Rus people the al-arsanija, whose king lived in the town of Arsa. The people have sometimes been identified by scholars as Erzya, sometimes as the aru people, and also as Udmurts. It has been suggested by historians that the town Arsa may refer to either the modern Ryazan or Arsk In the 14th century, the name Erzya is considered to have been mentioned in the form of ardzhani by Rashid-al-Din Hamadani, and as rzjan by Jusuf, the Nogaj khan In Russian sources, the ethnonym Erza first appears in the 18th century.

The earliest written mention of Moksha, in the form of Moxel, is considered to be in the works of a 13th-century Flemish traveler, William of Rubruck, and in the Persian chronicle of Rashid-al-Din, who reported the Golden Horde to be at war with the Moksha and the Ardzhans (Erzia).
In Russian sources, 'Moksha' appears from the 17th century.

Ethnic structure

The Mordvins are divided into two ethnic subgroups and three further subgroups:
 the Erzya people or Erzyans, (Erzya: Эрзят/Erzyat), speakers of the Erzya language. Less than half of the Erzyans live in the autonomous republic of Mordovia, Russian Federation, Sura River and Volga River. The rest are scattered over the Russian oblasts of Samara, Penza, Orenburg, as well as Tatarstan, Chuvashia, Bashkortostan, Siberia, Far East, Armenia and USA.
 the Moksha people or Mokshans, (Moksha: Мокшет/Mokshet), speakers of the Moksha language. Less than half of the Moksha population live in the autonomous republic of Mordovia, Russian Federation, in the basin of the Volga River. The rest are scattered over the Russian oblasts of Samara, Penza, Orenburg, as well as Tatarstan, Siberia, Far East, Armenia, Estonia, Australia and USA.
the Shoksha or Tengushev Mordvins constitute a transitional group between the Erzya and Moksha people and live in the southern part of Republic of Mordovia, in the Tengushevsk and Torbeevsk region.
the Karatai Mordvins or Qaratays live in the Republic of Tatarstan. They no longer speak a Volga-Finnic language but have assimilated with Tatars.
the Teryukhan Mordvins live near Nizhny Novgorod had been completely Russified by 1900 and today unambiguously identify as ethnic Russians.

Mokshin concludes that the above grouping does not represent subdivisions of equal ethnotaxonomic order, and discounts Shoksha, Karatai and Teryukhan as ethnonyms, identifying two Mordvin sub-ethnicities, the Erzya and the Moksha, and two "ethnographic groups", the Shoksha and the Karatai.

Two further formerly Mordvinic groups have assimilated to (Slavic and Turkic) superstrate influence:
The Meshcheryaks are believed to be Mordvins who have converted to Russian Orthodox Christianity and have adopted the Russian language.
The Mishars are Mordvins who came under Tatar influence and adopted the language (Mishar Tatar dialect) and the Sunni Muslim religion.

Religion
Erzya practices Christianity (Eastern Orthodox and Lutheranism brought by Finnish missionaries in the 1990s) and Ineshkipaza, a native monotheistic religion with some elements of pantheism. Almost all national-oriented intellectuals practice Ineshkipazia or Lutheranism.

Mariz Kemal, well-known Erzyan poetess, is also an organizer of traditional Erzyan religion communities. This phenomenon appeared after formation of Mordovian diocese of ROC in 1990. In those days Erzyan intellectuals were hoping to introduce of Erzyan language into worship ceremonies as well as to revive of Erzyan religious and cultural identity, even within ROC structure. Failure of these hopes made many Erzyan believers more radical and stimulated national-oriented intellectuals to renew their ethnic Ineshkipaza religion.

Appearance

The 1911 Encyclopædia Britannica noted that the Mordvins, although they had largely abandoned their language, had "maintained a good deal of their old national dress, especially the women, whose profusely embroidered skirts, original hair-dress large ear-rings which sometimes are merely hare-tails, and numerous necklaces covering all the chest and consisting of all possible ornaments, easily distinguish them from Russian women."

Britannica described the Mordvins as having mostly dark hair and blue eyes, with a rather small and narrow build. The Moksha were described as having a darker skin and darker eyes than the Erzya, while the Qaratays were described as "mixed with Tatars".

Latham described the Mordvins as taller than the Mari, with thin beards, flat faces and brown or red hair, red hair being more frequent among the Ersad than the Mokshad.

James Bryce described "the peculiar Finnish physiognomy" of the Mordvin diaspora in Armenia, "transplanted hither from the Middle Volga at their own wish", as characterised by "broad and smooth faces, long eyes, a rather flattish nose".

Cultures, folklores and mythologies

According to Tatiana Deviatkina, although sharing some similarities, no common Mordvin mythology has emerged, and therefore the Erza and Moksha mythologies are defined separately.

In the Erza mythology, the superior deities were hatched from an egg. The mother of gods is called Ange Patiai, followed by the Sun God, Chipaz, who gave birth to Nishkepaz; to the earth god, Mastoron kirdi; and to the wind god, Varmanpaz. From the union of Chipaz and the Harvest Mother, Norovava, was born the god of the underworld, Mastorpaz. The thunder god, Pur’ginepaz, was born from Niskende Teitert, (the daughter of the mother of gods, Ange Patiai).
The creation of the Earth is followed by the creation of the Sun, the Moon, humankind, and the Erza. Humans were created by Chipaz, the sun god, who, in one version, molded humankind from clay, while in another version, from soil.

In Moksha mythology, the Supreme God is called Viarde Skai. According to the legends, the creation of the world went through several stages: first the Devil moistened the building material in his mouth and spat it out. The piece that was spat out grew into a plain, which was modeled unevenly, creating the chasms and the mountains. The first humans created by Viarde Skai could live for 700–800 years and were giants of 99 archinnes. The underworld in Mokshan mythology was ruled by Mastoratia.

Latham reported strong pagan elements surviving Christianization. The 1911 Britannica noted how the Mordvins:

History

Prehistory
The Mordvins emerged from the common Volgaic group around the 1st century AD.

Proof that the Mordvins have long been settled in the vicinity of the Volga is also found in the fact that they still call the river Rav, reflecting the name Rha recorded by Ptolemy (c. AD 100 – c. 170).

The Gorodets culture dating back to around 500 BC has been associated with these people. The north-western neighbours were the Muromians and Merians who spoke related Finnic languages. To the north of the Mordvins lived the Maris, to the south the Khazars. The Mordvins' eastern neighbors, possibly remnants of the Huns, became the Bulgars around 700 AD.

Researchers have distinguished the ancestors of the Erzya and the Moksha from the mid-1st century AD by the different orientations of their burials and by elements of their costumes and the variety of bronze jewellery found by archaeologists in their ancient cemeteries. The Erzya graves from this era were oriented north-south, while the Moksha graves were found to be oriented south-north.

The Mordvin language began to diverge into Moksha and Erzya over the course of the 1st millennium AD. Erzyans lived in the northern parts of the territory, close to present-day Nizhny Novgorod. The Mokshans lived further south and west of present-day Mordovia, closer to the neighbouring Iranian, Bolgar and Turkic tribes, and fell under their cultural influence.

The social organization of Moksha and Erzya depended on patriarchy; the tribes were headed by elders kuda-ti who selected a tekshtai, senior elders responsible for coordinating wider regions.

Early history

Around 800 AD two major empires emerged in the neighborhood: Kievan Rus in present-day Ukraine and Russia adopted Eastern Orthodox Christianity, the Bolgar kingdom located at the confluence of Kama and Volga rivers adopted Islam, and some Moksha areas became tributaries to the latter until the 12th century.

Following the foundation of Nizhny Novgorod by Kievan Rus in 1221, the Mordvin territory increasingly fell under Russian domination, pushing the Mordvin populations southwards and eastwards beyond the Urals, and reducing their cohesion.

The Russian advance was halted by the Mongol Empire, and the Mordvins became subjects to Golden Horde until the beginning of 16th century.

Christianization of the Mordvin peoples took place during the 16th to 18th centuries, and most Mordvins today adhere to the Russian Orthodox Church all carrying Russian Orthodox names. In the 19th century Latham reported strong pagan elements surviving Christianization, the chief gods of the Erzyans and the Mokshas being called Paas and Shkai, respectively.

Modern history

Although the Mordvins were given an autonomous territory as a titular nation within the Soviet Union in 1928, Russification intensified during the 1930s, and knowledge of the Mordvin languages by the 1950s was in rapid decline.

After the fall of the Soviet Union, the Mordvins, like other indigenous peoples of Russia, experienced a rise in national consciousness. The Erzya national epic is called Mastorava, which stands for "Mother Earth". It was compiled by A. M. Sharonov and first published in 1994 in the Erzya language (it has since been translated into Moksha and Russian). Mastorava is also the name of a movement of ethnic separatism founded by D. Nadkin of the Mordovian State University, active in the early 1990s.

Finnic peoples, whose territories were included in the former USSR as well as many others, had a very brief period of national revival in 1989-1991. Finnic peoples of Idel-Ural were able to conduct their own national conventions: Udmurts (November 1991), Erzya and Moksha (March 1992), Mari (October 1992), the united convention of Finnic folks of Russia in Izhevsk (May 1992). All these conventions accepted similar resolutions with appeals to democratize political and public life in their respective republics and to support the national revival of Finnoic peoples. Estonia had strong influence on moods and opinions that dominated these conventions, (especially among national-oriented intellectuals) because many students at the University of Tartu were from Finnic republics of Russia.

At the time of the Soviet Union’s disintegration, Erzya and Moksha accounted for only 32,5% in total structure of population in Mordovia. The return of many Erzyans and Mokshans to their national identities was strongly challenged by Russification, urbanization and demographic crisis. In addition, part of Moksha national elites (and Erzyan to a lesser extent) came forward with an idea, that Erzyans and Mokshans are just sub-ethnic groups within the united Mordovian nation. This concept was readily supported by Russian authorities, but most representatives of the Erzyan national movement reacted very negatively. National activists perceived the idea of “united Mordovian nation” as another tool for hard Russification.

In 1989 Veĺmema community center emerges in Mordovia. Very soon it becomes popular attracting both Erzyans and Mokshans. In some time only cultural activity becomes quite a narrow scope for part of radical activists, and Veĺmema experiences a major split. Moderate members create Vajģeĺ organization focused on revival and popularization of national traditions, and a more radical group founded Mastorava, Erzan-Mokshan civic movement, that aims not only a cultural revival of both nations but also wants the presentation of their interests in government bodies.

National representative bodies 
Erzya has its own system of national representative bodies. Every time before Raskeń ozks that takes place every three years, Aťań Eźem (erz. Council of elders) is convened. Aťań Eźem is a collective body that discusses the major problems of Erzyan people. Aťań Eźem elects chief elder, Inyazor, by a secret ballot. Inyazor represents all Erzyan people till next Raskeń Ozks.

During the period from 1999 through 2019 position of Inyazor was held by Kshumantsian’Pirguzh, who was awarded Order of the Cross of St. Mary’s Land (est. Maarjamaa Risti teenetemärk) by President of Estonia in 2014. In 2019 during regular Raskeń Ozks Syres’ Boliayen’, chairman of Erźań Val Society, co-founder of Free Idel-Ural civic movement was elected as new Inyazor. His candidature was supported by 12 from 18 elders. Russian authorities do not recognize the legitimacy of the national representative bodies of Erzyan people. Syres’ Boliayen’ is now in exile in Ukraine and representatives of Aťań eźem, as well as first Inyazor Kshumantsian’Pirguzh, repeatedly reported about political pressure from Russian authorities.

According to Russian laws, the activity of national political parties (Erzya, Mari, Tatars, Chuvashs or any other) is forbidden. Consequently, the national representative agency of Erzya people is the only possible instrument to express the political aspirations of Erzya.

Due to the activity of Veĺmema, Vajģeĺ and Mastorava situation with human rights for Erzyans and Mokshans in Mordovia has changed significantly. Mordovian National theatre and faculty of national culture were founded in the republic, Language Law was adopted, productive relationships and contacts with foreign diaspores were established. Aforementioned organizations became a “talent foundry” for new associations of Erzya and Moksha, namely Od Vij, Erźava, Ĺitova, and Jurhtava; as well as for Mastorava and Erźań Mastor newspapers. Exactly due to the activity of all mentioned organizations and societies Erzyan and Mokshan national movements become able to progress from the ethnographic stage of their struggle to a political one.

At the end of the 1980s Pirguzh Kshumantsian’, human rights defender, and Mariz’ Kemal, poetess, became leaders of Erzyan national movement. They revived the tradition of Raskeń Ozks (erz. Family Prayer). 5 days before the very first Raskeń Ozks Kshumantsian’, as main organizer of the event, was arrested by Russian authorities. Police forced him to abandon the realization of Prayer, however, he refused to comply with the demands. In 1999 Pirguzh Kshumantsian’ was elected as the first Inyazor (chief elder) in the newest history of Erzyan people. He held this position up to 2019.

Mariz’ Kemal adhered to the principle of "Kavto keĺť - kavto raśkeť" (erz. "Two languages - two nations"), that denied the existence of the single Mordovian nation as the combination of sub-ethnic groups, namely Erzya and Moksha. National life in the Republic of Mordovia began to draw down with the installation of Vladimir Putin’s rule. The new president of Russia considered national republics and native peoples as “enemies inside”.

May 1, 2020 Atyan’ Ezem (erz. Elders’ Council) approved new system of national representative bodies. Statute on creation and functioning of national representative bodies of Erzya people consists of six chapters, describing aims and tasks of Erzya national movement, its governing bodies, their plenary powers and structure. According to the document, national movement directed by Promks – convention of delegates from Erzya political parties and public organizations. Convention forms Atyan’ Ezem, that is operative between Promks sessions and elects Inyazor (Chief Elder), who presents Erzya people and speaks on behalf of all the nation. In the event that there are any legal limitations for creation and operation of national parties (such prohibition exists in Russian Federation nowadays), then plenary powers of Promks are carried by Atyan’ Ezem. The main objective of Promks, Atyan’ Ezem and Inyazor, is to provide and defend national, political, economic and cultural rights of Erzya, including right to national self-determination within national Erzya territories.

Demographics

Latham (1854) quoted a total population of 480,000. Mastyugina (1996) quotes 1.15 million. The 2002 Russian census reports 0.84 million.

According to estimates by Tartu University made in the late 1970s, less than one third of Mordvins lived in the autonomous republic of Mordovia, in the basin of the Volga River.

Others are scattered (2002) over the Russian oblasts of Samara (116,475), Penza (86,370), Orenburg (68,880) and Nizhni Novgorod (36,705), Ulyanovsk (61,100), Saratov (23,380), Moscow (22,850), Tatarstan (28,860), Chuvashia (18,686), Bashkortostan (31,932), Siberia (65,650), Russian Far East (29,265).

Populations in parts of the former Soviet Union not now part of Russia are: Kyrgyz Republic 5,390, Turkmenistan 3,490, Uzbekistan 14,175, Kazakhstan, (34,370), Azerbaijan (1,150), Estonia (985), Armenia (920).

List of notable Mordvins
Erzyans
 Alyona Erzymasskaya 17th-century Erzyan female military leader, the heroine of civil war.
 Stepan Erzya (Stepan Nefedov, 1876–1959), sculptor
 Fyodor Vidyayev, World War II submarine commander and war hero
Aleksandr Sharonov, philologist, poet, writer
 Kuzma Alekseyev
 Valeri Vasioukhin, Professor of Cancer Biology, University of Washington. {}
 Vasily Chapayev (Erzya father)
 Nadezhda Kadysheva singer
 Mokshans
 Mikhail Devyatayev (1917–2002)
 Andrey Kizhevatov, a Soviet border guard commander, one of the leaders of the Defense of Brest Fortress during Operation Barbarossa.
 Oleg Maskaev, Russian boxer
 Vasily Shukshin, Soviet writer and actor

See also
 Merya
 Meshchera
 Mordovian cuisine
 Mordvin Native Religion
 Mordvinic languages
 Muromian
 Volga Finns
 Arthania

References and notes

Further reading
 
 Devyatkina, Tatiana. Mythology of Mordvins: Encyclopaedia. Saransk, 2007.
 
 Mokshin, Nikolai F. "The Mordva – Ethnonym or Ethnopholism", chapter 5 of Marjorie Mandelstam Balzer (ed.),Culture Incarnate: Native Anthropology from Russia, M.E. Sharpe (1995), 29–45 (English translation of a 1991 Sovetskaia etnografiia article).
 Petrukhin, Vladimir. Mordvins Mythology // Myths of Finno-Ugric Peoples. Moscow, 2005. p. 292 - 335.

External links

Library of Congress: A Country Study: Soviet Union (Former)
The Finns of the steppe and their Mordvin names – Article about Mordvin culture and names

Mordovia news
 Info-RM 
 Info-RM (In the Moksha language)
 Info-RM (In the Erzya language)

Mordvin toponymy
 Sándor Maticsák, Nina Kazaeva. "History of the Research of Mordvinian Place Names" (Onomastica Uralica)
 Info-RM republic of Mordovia news in Moksha
 Finno-Ugric World news, articles in Moksha
  Moksha-English-Moksha online dictionary

Ethnic groups in Russia
Volga Finns
Indigenous peoples of Europe